Pansio is a district and a suburb of the city of Turku, Finland. It is located in the western part of the city. It has a population of 2,809, and an annual population growth of -3.83%.

19.25% of the district's population are under 15 years old, while 11.85% are over 65. The district's linguistic makeup is 87.82% Finnish, 1.55% Swedish, and 10.93% other. Pansio has a problem with unemployment, with an unemployment rate of 14.2% - the sixth highest of all districts in Turku.

A good part of the district is industrial area, and parts of the Port of Turku are located there. Pansio also hosts a naval base of the Finnish Navy, Archipelago Sea Naval Command.

See also
 Districts of Turku
 Districts of Turku by population

Districts of Turku